Nymphidium  is a genus in the butterfly family Riodinidae present only in the Neotropical realm.

Some Nymphidium are obviously secondarily transformed by mimicry, otherwise the almost exclusive colours are brown and white either of which being now and then preponderant. The wings have a normal shape without indentations, tail appendages, lobing or coiling. The larva is shaped like a woodlouse, hunched, green, sometimes with a yellow lateral streak, the neck organ out of a transverse row of green spikes or bristles. It has a guard of ants. The pupa is green, fastened by a belt-like thread. The butterflies rest on the under surface of leaves and are chased up by beating the bushes, whereupon they fly like Geometridae for some paces, in order to hide themselves again. The swarming-time seems to be dawn, or the early morning, but the author came across them yet in the sunshine of the morning on blossoms. They are easily taken and fly low.

Species 
Nymphidium acherois (Boisduval, 1836) present in French Guiana, Brazil
Nymphidium ariari Callaghan, 1988 present in Colombia
Nymphidium ascolia Hewitson, [1853] present in Guatemala, Bolivia, Brazil
Nymphidium aurum Callaghan, 1985 present in Brazil
Nymphidium azanoides Butler, 1867 present in Costa Rica, Ecuador, Brazil
Nymphidium baeotia Hewitson, [1853] present in French Guiana, Guyana, Brazil
Nymphidium balbinus Staudinger, [1887] present in Colombia
Nymphidium cachrus (Fabricius, 1787) present in French Guiana, Guyana, Trinidad and Tobago, Colombia
Nymphidium callaghani Brévignon, 1999 present in French Guiana
Nymphidium caricae (Linnaeus, 1758) present in French Guiana, Guyana, Suriname, Colombia, Ecuador, Peru, Venezuela, Brazil
Nymphidium carmentis Stichel, 1910 present in Ecuador, Bolivia
Nymphidium chimborazium Bates, 1868 present in Ecuador
Nymphidium chione Bates, 1867 present in Brazil
Nymphidium colleti Gallard, 2008
Nymphidium derufata Callaghan, 1985 present in Suriname
Nymphidium fulminans Bates, 1868 present in Colombia, Brazil
Nymphidium guyanensis Gallard & Brévignon, 1989 present in French Guiana
Nymphidium haematostictum Godman & Salvin, 1878 present in Costa Rica, Panama
Nymphidium hermieri Gallard, 2008
Nymphidium hesperinum Stichel, 1911 present in Peru
Nymphidium latibrunis Callaghan, 1985 present in Ecuador
Nymphidium lenocinium Schaus, 1913 present in Costa Rica, Colombia
Nymphidium leucosia (Hübner, [1806]) present in Colombia, Peru, Brazil
Nymphidium lisimon (Stoll, 1790) present in French Guiana, Guyana, Suriname, Peru, Brazil
Nymphidium manicorensis Callaghan, 1985 present in French Guiana, Brazil
Nymphidium mantus (Cramer, 1775) present in French Guiana, Guyana, Suriname, Costa Rica, Venezuela, Trinidad and Tobago, Brazil
Nymphidium menalcus (Stoll, 1782) present in French Guiana, Suriname, Venezuela
Nymphidium ninias Hewitson, 1865 present in Brazil
Nymphidium nivea Talbot, 1928 present in Brazil
Nymphidium olinda Bates, 1865 present in Panama, Venezuela, Brazil
Nymphidium omois Hewitson, 1865 present in Amazon basin
Nymphidium onaeum Hewitson, 1869 present in Honduras, Panama
Nymphidium plinthobaphis Stichel, 1910 present in Brazil, Peru
Nymphidium smalli Callaghan, 1999 present in Panama
Nymphidium strati Kaye, 1925 present in Trinidad and Tobago
Nymphidium trinidadi Callaghan, 1999 present in Trinidad and Tobago
Nymphidium undimargo Seitz, 1917 present in Brazil

Sources 
Nymphidium on Markku Savela's website on Lepidoptera

External links

Nymphidium at Butterflies of America

Nymphidiini
Butterfly genera
Taxa named by Johan Christian Fabricius